Claude Lowitz (born 29 May 1962) is a French former professional football player and manager. As a player, he was a defender.

Club career
Lowitz played for ten different clubs during his career. Those included Toulouse, Metz, Paris Saint-Germain, Marseille, Montpellier, Nantes, Pau FC, Cahors FC, Gazélec Ajaccio, and Jeanne d'Arc. In 1984 with Metz, he notably featured in a 4–1 win over Barcelona at the Camp Nou in the Cup Winners' Cup first round, eliminating the Spanish side 6–5 on aggregate. During the 1985–86 season with Paris Saint-Germain, he won the Division 1 title.

International career 
Lowitz played one match for the France Olympic football team in 1987.

Post-playing career 
Having retired from football five years earlier, Lowitz became the manager of Saint-Pierroise in Réunion in 2001; however, he left this role in 2002. From January to July 2006, he was the manager of China League Two club Shanghai Dongya. He left that position to work for the youth academy of the club at the Genbao Football Base from 2006 to 2008.

After leaving his academy role at Shanghai Dongya in 2008, Lowitz worked for a football academy in Réunion.

Honours 
Toulouse
 Division 2: 1981–82

Paris Saint-Germain
 Division 1: 1985–86

References

External links 
 
 

1962 births
Living people
Sportspeople from Lot (department)
French footballers
French football managers
Association football defenders
Toulouse FC players
FC Metz players
Paris Saint-Germain F.C. players
Olympique de Marseille players
Montpellier HSC players
FC Nantes players
Pau FC players
Gazélec Ajaccio players
SS Jeanne d'Arc players
Olympic footballers of France
JS Saint-Pierroise managers
Shanghai Port F.C. managers
French expatriate sportspeople in China
Expatriate football managers in China
French expatriate football managers
Footballers from Occitania (administrative region)